Tata Novus is the Tata Motors' first new offering from its acquisition of Daewoo's truck manufacturing unit. Tata Novus is based on the Daewoo Novus truck available in South Korea. It was launched in December 2005. Tata Motors became the first Indian manufacturer to introduce  heavy commercial vehicles.

Tata Novus is powered by a Cummins C8.3-300 engine that's Bharat Stage III compliant. It comes with a fully synchronised gear box with 10 forward gears and 2 reverse gears. Korean variants however use the Cummins ISM 440 or the IVECO FPT Cursor 11 420 for newer models.

References

External links
 Tata Motors official website
 Tata Novus official website

Novus
Vehicles introduced in 2005